These are the list of personnel changes in the NBA from the 1963–64 NBA season.

Events

July 15, 1963
 The Philadelphia 76ers hired Dolph Schayes as head coach.

August 6, 1963
 The San Francisco Warriors hired Alex Hannum as head coach.

August 14, 1963
 The San Francisco Warriors traded Hubie White to the Philadelphia 76ers for John Windsor.

August 15, 1963
 The Baltimore Bullets signed Mel Peterson as a free agent.

September 4, 1963
 The San Francisco Warriors sold Willie Naulls to the Boston Celtics.

September 6, 1963
 The Los Angeles Lakers claimed Don Nelson on waivers from the Chicago Zephyrs.

September 24, 1963
 The Cincinnati Royals sold Hub Reed to the Los Angeles Lakers.

October 1, 1963
 The Baltimore Bullets claimed Roger Strickland on waivers from the Los Angeles Lakers.

October 14, 1963
 The Boston Celtics signed Larry Siegfried as a free agent.

October 16, 1963
 The Philadelphia 76ers sold Tom Hoover to the New York Knicks.

October 18, 1963
 The New York Knicks traded Richie Guerin to the St. Louis Hawks for cash and a 1964 2nd round draft pick (Howard Komives was later selected).

October 21, 1963
 The Philadelphia 76ers sold Len Chappell to the New York Knicks.

October 28, 1963
 The Detroit Pistons traded Kevin Loughery to the Baltimore Bullets for Larry Staverman.

October 29, 1963
 The Baltimore Bullets traded Bill McGill to the New York Knicks for Paul Hogue and Gene Shue.

November ?, 1963
 The St. Louis Hawks signed Bevo Nordmann as a free agent.

November 11, 1963
 The St. Louis Hawks sold Bob Duffy to the New York Knicks.

November 12, 1963
 The New York Knicks waived Bevo Nordmann.

December 16, 1963
 In a 3-team trade, the Cincinnati Royals traded Bob Boozer to the New York Knicks; the Detroit Pistons traded Larry Staverman to the Cincinnati Royals; the Detroit Pistons traded Johnny Egan to the New York Knicks; and the New York Knicks traded Donnie Butcher and Bob Duffy to the Detroit Pistons.

April 16, 1964
 The Detroit Pistons sold Darrall Imhoff to the Los Angeles Lakers.

May 1, 1964
 The New York Knicks claimed Hub Reed on waivers from the Los Angeles Lakers.
 The New York Knicks sold Hub Reed to the Detroit Pistons. This completes the trade where New York obtained Johnny Egan from Detroit on December 11, 1963.

June 18, 1964
 The Baltimore Bullets traded Terry Dischinger, Don Kojis and Rod Thorn to the Detroit Pistons for Bob Ferry, Bailey Howell, Les Hunter, Wali Jones and Don Ohl.

August 8, 1964
 Slick Leonard resigns as head coach for Baltimore Bullets.

References
NBA Transactions at NBA.com
1963-64 NBA Transactions| Basketball-Reference.com

Transactions
NBA transactions